Ridgeway is a census-designated place (CDP) in Kenai Peninsula Borough, Alaska, United States. At the 2020 census the population was 2,136, up from 2,022 in 2010.

Geography 
Ridgeway is located on the western side of the Kenai Peninsula at  (60.519682, -151.060911). It is bordered to the northwest by the city of Kenai and to the south by the city of Soldotna, the borough seat. It is bordered to the east, across Soldotna Creek, by the unincorporated Sterling CDP, and to the west, across the Kenai River, by the Kalifornsky CDP.

Demographics

Ridgeway first appeared on the 1990 U.S. Census as a census-designated place (CDP).

As of the census of 2000, there were 1,932 people, 715 households, and 536 families residing in the CDP. There were 938 housing units at an average density of 56.3/sq mi (21.8/km2). The racial makeup of the CDP was 87.8% White, 0.4% Black or African American, 4.3% Native American, 0.8% Asian, 0.1% Pacific Islander, 1.6% from other races, and 5.1% from two or more races.  2.5% of the population were Hispanic or Latino of any race.

There were 715 households, out of which 39.3% had children under the age of 18 living with them, 62.5% were married couples living together, 9.5% had a female householder with no husband present, and 24.9% were non-families. 18.9% of all households were made up of individuals, and 4.2% had someone living alone who was 65 years of age or older.  The average household size was 2.70 and the average family size was 3.09.

In the CDP, the population was spread out, with 29.5% under the age of 18, 6.7% from 18 to 24, 26.5% from 25 to 44, 31.0% from 45 to 64, and 6.4% who were 65 years of age or older.  The median age was 38 years. For every 100 females, there were 98.6 males.  For every 100 females age 18 and over, there were 99.3 males.

The median income for a household in the CDP was $50,625, and the median income for a family was $56,985. Males had a median income of $51,488 versus $36,786 for females. The per capita income for the CDP was $23,225.  About 7.4% of families and 9.4% of the population were below the poverty line, including 11.6% of those under age 18 and 15.5% of those age 65 or over.

References 

Census-designated places in Alaska
Census-designated places in Kenai Peninsula Borough, Alaska